Mason Motors, founded by A. C. Mason in cooperation with William C. Durant, was a U.S. truck manufacturer based in Flint, Michigan. As a subsidiary of Durant Motors, Mason Truck built Road King Speed Trucks in the early 1920s. Mason Motors also built automobile engines in 1911, who first led Buick's engine works in Flint. That company was absorbed by Chevrolet in 1915, but remained under the Chevrolet umbrella until January 1, 1918, when it became known as the Motor and Axle Division of Chevrolet.

There were four separate automobile companies using the name "Mason" between 1898 and 1914 with locations in Massachusetts, Iowa, Illinois and New York. Records show that Mason Motors of Flint, MI was a truck manufacturer and also supplied engines for Buick use, but they did not manufacture passenger automobiles.

References

Defunct motor vehicle manufacturers of the United States
Durant Motors